The 2000 O'Byrne Cup was a Gaelic football competition played by the county teams of Leinster GAA.

The tournament was a straight knockout, with 12 teams.

Longford were the winners, defeating Westmeath in the final in Cusack Park, Mullingar. In the final, the Westmeath manager, Brendan Lowry, intruded onto the pitch and clashed with a Longford player and the referee; he received a six-month suspension. The suspension was later lifted.

Results

References

External links
Leinster G.A.A. Results 2000

O'Byrne Cup
O'Byrne Cup